Morris P. Bodnar (born 4 September 1948) was a member of the House of Commons of Canada at the Saskatoon—Dundurn electoral district from 1993 to 1997. Born in Saskatoon, Saskatchewan, Bodnar is a lawyer by career.

Bodnar won election to the 35th Canadian Parliament with the Liberal party in the 1993 federal election. He was defeated by Reform party candidate Allan Kerpan in the Blackstrap electoral district in the 1997 federal election. Bodnar was also unsuccessful in the 2000 federal election when he attempted to return to Parliament in the Saskatoon—Humboldt riding.

References
 

1948 births
Living people
Liberal Party of Canada MPs
Members of the House of Commons of Canada from Saskatchewan
Politicians from Saskatoon